Grajaú is the main neighborhood of the district of Grajaú, located in the South Zone of the city of São Paulo, Brazil. It is located near Jardim Eliana and Jardim Lucélia. It has shops, bakeries and supermarkets.

Toponymy 
The toponym "Grajaú" derivers from the Tupi term karaîá'y, meaning "river of Karajá" (karaîá, carajá + 'y, rio).

See also
 Subprefecture of Capela do Socorro
 Grajaú (CPTM) Train Station
 Line 9 (CPTM)
 Roman Catholic Diocese of Santo Amaro

References

External links
 Subprefecture of Capela do Socorro
 Official page of the Paulista Metropolitan Trains Company
 Roman Catholic Diocese of Santo Amaro

Neighbourhoods in São Paulo